The Miss Earth Botswana is a beauty pageant that was first held in 2006, with winner will be competing at the Miss Earth pageant. This pageant is not related to the Miss Universe Botswana or Miss Botswana.

The pageant
Botswana made its debut at Miss Earth in 2006. The winner is involved in numerous environmental education initiatives, with more emphasis on educating the general public about the importance of a cleaner and safer environment and involved in tree planting, road safety campaigns, and taking part in the commemoration of environmentally related days such as World Environment Day. Traditionally, the winner of Miss Earth Botswana represents the country at Miss Earth. On occasion, when the winner does not qualify (due to age), a runner-up is sent. The pageant is based in Gaborone and  organized by its Country Director, Tebogo Moagi and  Publicity Officer, Beatrice Barrows.

Botswana did not compete in 2009 and 2013. Miss Earth Botswana 2009, Tumisang Sebina, was unable to compete in the international pageant since she did not meet the  Miss Earth minimum height requirement. This caused organisers to change the local pageant rules that exclude anyone below the required height, ensuring that Botswana would be represented internationally.

Titleholders
Color key

See also
 Miss Universe Botswana
 Miss Botswana
Botswana at major beauty pageants

References

External links 
Official facebook
 

Botswana
Botswana
Recurring events established in 2006
2006 establishments in Botswana
Botswana awards